Berry Linux is a Live CD Linux distribution that has English and Japanese support. The distribution is primarily focused on use as a Live CD, but it can also be installed to a live USB drive. Berry Linux can be used to try out and showcase Linux, for educational purposes, or as a rescue system, without the need to make changes to a hard disk. The current version is 1.37 released on 14 December 2022.

Features 
Berry includes read/write NTFS support, and AIGLX and Beryl are bundled for 3D  desktop effects. Berry also uses bootsplash, giving it a graphical startup.

The full version (v1.12) includes  and runs on Linux Kernel 3.0.4. It has the ALSA sound system, ACPI support, and SELinux. Berry Linux features automatic hardware detection, with support for many graphics cards, sound cards, SCSI, USB devices and many other peripherals. Network devices are automatically configured with DHCP.

The full version of Berry Linux uses KDE (Version 4.6.5) while Berry Linux Mini uses the Fluxbox window manager. The full version is 512.7MB, while the mini version is 273.4MB. To test Berry Linux it is not necessary to install the distribution to a hard disk, as the operating system runs entirely from CD-ROM. It is, however, possible to install Berry Linux to a hard disk, which requires 1.7 gigabytes of free space.
Supporting Japanese, Berry includes Whiz, a sharp Kana-Kanji conversion system. It also comes with LibreOffice version 3.4.3, a Microsoft Office compatible office suite, as well as TextMaker/PlanMaker as Berry's office software. The GIMP, version 2.6.10, is bundled for graphics software.

Berry includes the media players Audacious, MPlayer, Xine, and Kaffeine. DVD and DivX codecs are installed by default.

Version history 
Berry Linux's historical releases are as following.

See also

Fedora

References

External links

 Berry Linux Project
 Berry Linux Project (Japanese)
 Berry Linux Project (English)
 Download Berry

RPM-based Linux distributions
Live CD
Linux distributions